Johann Ernst Hanxleden (1681–1732), better identified as Arnos Pathiri, was a German Jesuit priest and missionary, best known for his contributions as a Malayalam and Sanskrit poet, grammarian, lexicographer, and philologist. He lived in India for most part of his life and became a scholar of Sanskrit and Malayalam languages before authoring Puthen Pana, a poem on the life of Jesus Christ, Malayalam–Portuguese Dictionary, the first dictionary in Malayalam as well as two linguistic treatises, Malayalavyaakaranam and Sidharoopam.

Early life
Johann Ernst Hanxleden was born at Ostercappeln, near Osnabrück, in Lower Saxony, Germany in 1681. While studying philosophy at his home town of Osnabruck, he met Wilhelm Weber, a Jesuit priest to whom he volunteered for service in India as a part of the then Jesuit mission in Malabar. On 30 October 1699 he set out on a long journey to India, along with Wilhelm Weber and another Jesuit priest, Wilhelm Meyr, travelling through present day Italy, the Ottoman Empire, Syria, Armenia, and Persia to reach Surat (of present-day Gujarat), India on 13 December 1700. During the journey, he entered into a novitiate and proceeded to Goa where there was a large community of Jesuits.

In India

After completing his spiritual formation (Novitiate) in Goa, Hanxleden was sent to a Jesuit Seminary at Sampaloor in Thrissur District of the south Indian state of Kerala. It is at St. Paul's Seminary in Sampaloor, he did his theological studies for preparing himself to receive priesthood. He took time also to initiate himself to the local language, Malayalam and more importantly studied the Syriac, the liturgical language of the Thomas Christians of Kerala. He was ordained priest in 1706. In addition to his mother tongue German, and his mastery of Malayalam, he also had a good command over Latin, Syriac, Portuguese, Sanskrit, and Tamil.

After moving to Palayoor, Hanxleden studied Sanskrit too and improved his Malayalam, learning under the tutelage of Namboodiri scholars such as Kunjan and Krishnan from Angamaly and Thekkemadom from Thrissur. From 1707 to 1711, he served as secretary to John Ribeiro, the then Archbishop of Cranganore and visited many places in Kerala on tasks such as preaching and Catechesis. It is recorded that he also served as the vicar of the main church in Malabar. Later, he moved to Velur, Thrissur, a small village near Thrissur District in 1712 and built the Velur Forane Church. From 1729 onward, he spent his time between Velur, Sampaloor, Palayoor and Pazhuvil and it was at Pazhuvil he suffered a snake bite which resulted in his death on 20 March 1732, at the age of 51. He was buried there but, later, when a memorial was built outside the church, his mortal remains were transferred to it; the memorial also houses a historical museum.

The church and his home in Velur have since been declared as a protected monument by the Government of Kerala. Among various exhibits at the museum are the bed used by Hanxleden and the chathurangam (which Hanxleden used to play) columns marked on the floor of his home. Mar Francis Vazhapilly, Metropolitan Archbishop of Thrissur from 1921 to 1942, used to stay at the Velur Forane Church for a few days during Lent so that he could sleep on the bed used by Arnos Paathiri and drink from the well dug during his times.

His life has been documented in many books; Arnos Pathiri - a Biography, written by A. Adappur, a Catholic priest Arnos Pathiri, written by Mathew Ulakamthara Arnos Pathiri - Jeevacharithram of N. K. Jos and Arnos Padri, written by C. K. Mattam count among them.

Legacy
Arnos Paathiri's oeuvre comprises poems, dictionaries and grammar books and two of his prominent literary works are Puthen Pana and Chathuranthyam.

Puthen Pana
The Puthen Pana, a Malayalam epic on the life of Jesus Christ, is Arnos Pathiri's most popular poem and it is one of the earliest poems written in simple Malayalam. It has been an inalienable part of Christian (not restricted to Catholic) life in Kerala since the time of its composition; its paadhams are sung in a characteristic manner in Christian households on various solemn occasions, the most notable ones being Holy Thursday, Good Friday, and other days of Holy Week and Lent and evenings preceding funerals. It is reported that he wrote Puthen Pana sitting by the well of Pazhuvil Forane church.

The poem which follows a similar style to the noted work, Jnanappana of Poonthanam Nambudiri, consists of fourteen Paadhams; the couplets are written in the Sarppini Vruththam, except for those in the twelfth Paadham, which are in the Nathonnatha metre. The twelfth Paadham on the lament of the Virgin Mary at the crucifixion and death of Jesus is the heart of the poem. Other important Paadhams are concerned with the Fall of Man (second), the Annunciation (fourth), the Nativity (fifth), the Sermon on the Mount (seventh), the Last Supper (tenth), the trial and Crucifixion (eleventh), the Resurrection (thirteenth), and the Ascension (fourteenth). The first paadham has the poet telling us that the poem is being written on request from Antonio Pimental, the Archbishop of Cranganore; Pimental held the ecclesiastical office from 1721 to 1752, the poem is estimated to have been composed some time during the period 1721–1732.

Chathuranthyam
The Chathuranthyam is a mystic poem on the four ends of man: Maranam, Vidhi, Moksham and Narakam parts of the poem are sung on occasions similar to the Puththenpaana recitals. While his poems are written works, they also have a strong oral tradition; many pious Christians learn his poetical works by heart for recitals.

Malayalam–Portuguese Dictionary
Arnos Pathiri was the first to compile a Malayalam Dictionary and his lexicon described Malayalam words in both Sanskrit and Portuguese.

Others 
Pathiri was the first European to write a Sanskrit grammar Grammatica grandonica and also the first European to compose Sanskrit verse. He also wrote a short and succinct grammar for the Malayalam language. Along with his predecessor, Heinrich Roth, he was one of the pioneering European Sanskrit scholars, and he has written several essays on Ramayana and Mahabharata, in Latin. Marana Parvam, Vidhi Parvam, Moksha Parvam, Naraka Parvam, Umma Parvam, Misiha Charitham, and Jehova Parvam are some of his other works.

Arnos Padre Academy is an eponymous organization based in Velur, established in memory of Hanxleden and the academy has taken steps to get his writings translated into English with the help of European scholars.

Selected works

 
 Chathuranthyam 
 Genevieva Punyacharithram 
 Ummaadaey Dhukhkham 
 
 Malayalavyaakaranam 
 Samskrutham – Portuguese Dictionary  
 Samskruthavyaakaranam 
 Ave Maris Stella

See also

Hermann Gundert
V. Nagel
George Mathan
 List of Malayalam-language authors by category
 List of Malayalam-language authors

Notes

References

Further reading
 
 P. J. Thomas: Malayalasaahithyavum Kristhyaanikalum, D. C. Books, Kottayam, 1989.
 M. Mundadan, An Unknown Oriental Scholar: Ernest Hanxleden, Indian Church History Review 23 (1989) 39–63.
 J. J. Pallath, Ed.: Arnos Padiri: the first Malayalam poet scholar orientalist, Arnos Padiri publications, Calicut, 1994.
 Joseph J. Palackal, Puthen Pana: A musical study, Master's thesis, Hunter college of the City university of New York, 1995, Christian Musicological Society of India.

External links
Grammatica Grandonica: The Sanskrit Grammar of Johann Ernst Hanxleden s.j. (1681-1732), introduced and edited, with a photographical reproduction of the original manuscript by Vielle, Christophe ; Van Hal, Toon ; Muller, Jean-Claude
 
 

1681 births
1732 deaths
18th-century German Jesuits
18th-century Indian Jesuits
People from Thrissur district
German lexicographers
German orientalists
German philologists
Malayalam-language writers
People from Osnabrück (district)
German male non-fiction writers
Clergy from Lower Saxony
18th-century lexicographers